Grace Evangelical Lutheran Church may refer to:

Sites on the National Park Service National Register of Historic Places:

 Grace Evangelical Lutheran Church (Highland Park, Michigan)
 Grace Evangelical Lutheran Church (Minneapolis, Minnesota)